Gérard Andre Simond (11 May 1904 – 9 January 1995) was a French ice hockey player. He competed in the men's tournament at the 1928 Winter Olympics.

References

1904 births
1995 deaths
Chamonix HC players
Ice hockey players at the 1928 Winter Olympics
Olympic ice hockey players of France
People from Chamonix
Sportspeople from Haute-Savoie